The Salaverry-Santa Cruz War, sometimes called the Peruvian Civil War of 1835–1836, was an internal conflict in Peru with the involvement of the Bolivian army of Andres de Santa Cruz. At the Battle of Yanacocha (August 13, 1835), Santa Cruz's army lost 211 killed and 71 wounded, while Gamarra's army lost 400 killed and 985 taken prisoner. At the Battle of Uchumayo, Santa Cruz's army lost 315 killed.

References

Bibliography
 Colección de documentos y de sucessos notables en las campañas de pacificación del Perú 
 Historia de Bolivia, 5º edición, editorial Gisbert.
 http://www.cervantesvirtual.com/servlet/SirveObras/01316119700682055644802/p0000003.htm
 Basadre, Jorge. La Iniciación de la república: contribución al estudio de la evolución política y social del Perú. Lima: UNMSM, Fondo Editorial, 2002. 
 Basadre, Jorge: Historia de la República del Perú. 1822 - 1933, Octava Edición, corregida y aumentada. Tomos 1 y 2. Editada por el Diario "La República" de Lima y la Universidad "Ricardo Palma". Impreso en Santiago de Chile, 1998.

Wars involving Peru
Conflicts in 1835
Conflicts in 1836